Jay McNeill is a Canadian retired ice hockey right wing who was an All-American for Colorado College

Career
McNeill was a high-scoring forward during his junior career, averaging more than a goal per game over two seasons for the Powell River Paper Kings. He finished tied for third in league scoring in 1992 and began attending Colorado College in the fall. He continued offensive pace as a freshman, clicking at over a point per game in his first year with the Tigers. McNeill was named to the conference All-Rookie team despite CC finishing last in the WCHA. The team changed coaches during the offseason and new bench boss Don Lucia brought about a immediate change to the program's fortunes. McNeill led the team in scoring as the Tigers finished atop league standings for the first time in 37 years.

As a junior, McNeill was the third highest goal-scorer in the nation and was named an All-American. He helped CC reach the NCAA Tournament for the first time in 17 years. For his final season, McNeill's point production increased for the fourth straight season, helping Colorado College win their third consecutive conference championship. McNeill's team won its first tournament games in 39 years and returned to the championship game for the first time since winning the title in 1957. Their appearance came with a bit of controversy, however, as McNeill's assist on the winning marker appeared to have been a hand pass. Because the NCAA didn't allow the use of replay at the time, the goal was allowed to stand. In the final game, McNeill was held off the scoresheet and the Tigers lost in overtime to Michigan, coincidentally, the same team CC had defeated back in '57.

After graduating, McNeill began his professional career in the ECHL. While he continued to produce points, he didn't receive much interest from AAA teams and headed to Europe in 1998. He spent most of the next decade playing in the lower German leagues, scoring at an incredible pace. In the early '00s, he spent most of three years playing with the Tilburg Trappers and helped the team win the Dutch league championship in 2001. McNeill retired in 2009.

Statistics

Regular season and playoffs

Awards and honors

References

External links

1972 births
Living people
Ice hockey people from British Columbia
People from Powell River, British Columbia
Canadian ice hockey right wingers
Colorado College Tigers men's ice hockey players
AHCA Division I men's ice hockey All-Americans
Richmond Renegades players
Columbus Chill players
Adendorfer EC players
Tilburg Trappers players